The Airing of Grievances is the first studio album by American punk rock band Titus Andronicus, released on the Troubleman Unlimited record label on April 14, 2008. The album combines elements of punk rock, shoegaze, and lo-fi music. It was reissued on January 20, 2009 on XL Recordings.

The album title is a reference to the Seinfeld episode "The Strike", where the "Airing of Grievances" is a practice observed during the fictional holiday of "Festivus".

Track listing 

Notes
"Fear and Loathing in Mahwah, NJ" contains a reading from The Most Lamentable Romaine Tragedy of Titus Andronicus by William Shakespeare.
"Titus Andronicus" contains an interpolation of "You Can't Quit, You're Fired" by Roger Klotz.
"No Future Part II: The Day After No Future" contains a reading from The Stranger by Albert Camus, translated from the French by Stuart Gilbert.

Personnel

Titus Andronicus
Liam Betson – guitar, vocals, percussion
Ian Dykstra – drums
Ian Graetzer – bass guitar
Patrick Stickles – lead vocals, guitar, synthesiser, piano, glockenspiel, tambourine
Daniel Tews – guitar, vocals, percussion

Additional musicians
Sarim Al-Rawi – vocals, percussion
David Bently – cello
Andrew Cedermark – guitar
Elio Deluca – electric piano
Eric Harm – vocals, percussion
Kevin Kearns – vocals
Amy Klein – violin
Eliane Labate – saxophone
Kevin McMahon – guitar, vocals
Sean Neafsey – vocals
Brian Nowakowski – trumpet
Susan Putnins – vocals, piano
Megan Stickles – baby noises
Ava Tews – clarinet

Production and recording by Kevin McMahon at Marcata Recording, New Paltz, NY between August and December 2007. Mastered by Guy Davie at Electric Mastering, London. Cover photo by Patrick Stickles and typography by Ian O'Neil.

References

External links

2008 debut albums
Titus Andronicus (band) albums
XL Recordings albums